Choi Wan Estate is a public housing estate in Ngau Chi Wan, Wong Tai Sin District, Kowloon, Hong Kong, located between Ngau Chi Wan Village and Jordan Valley and the foot of Fei Ngo Shan. The estate is divided into Choi Wan (I) Estate and Choi Wan (II) Estate, and has a total of 21 blocks. It is one of the largest public housing estates in Wong Tai Sin District.

Background

Choi Wan Estate was the site of Ngau Chi Wan Village. Its name Choi Wan fits its geographical position because "Wan" (i.e. Choi Wan Estate, "Wan" means cloud in Cantonese) is above "Hung" (i.e. Choi Hung Estate, "Hung" means rainbow in Cantonese). The estate started construction in 1976 and finished in 1979.

Choi Wan Estate is one of the few public housing estates in Hong Kong which blocks are not named with character in the estate name (i.e. "Choi" or "Wan"). Instead, the blocks are named based on the Chinese astronomical matters, for instance, Ngan Ho House (lit. galaxy house) and Koon Yat House ("Koon Yat" meaning "viewing the sun"). The estate is also the namesake for the northwestern Pacific Ocean
tropical cyclone name Choi-wan.

Houses

Choi Wan (I) Estate

Choi Wan (II) Estate

Choi Fai Estate
Choi Fai Estate is a public housing estate in Ngau Chi Wan, at the upper hill above Choi Wan Estate and the foot of Fei Ngo Shan. It has only 2 blocks built in 1995.

Houses

Choi Fung Court 
Choi Fung Court is a Home Ownership Scheme court in Ngau Chi Wan, near Choi Wan (I) Estate. It has one block built in 1997.

Houses

Education
Choi Wan Estate, Choi Fai Estate, and Choi Fung Court are in Primary One Admission (POA) School Net 45. Within the school net are multiple aided schools (operated independently but funded with government money); no government primary schools are in this net.

See others
Ngau Chi Wan
Choi Hung Estate

References

Residential buildings completed in 1978
Residential buildings completed in 1981
Residential buildings completed in 1980
Ngau Chi Wan
Wong Tai Sin District
Public housing estates in Hong Kong